Filip Stanković (born 3 January 1997) is a Serbian footballer, who plays as a defender for Car Konstantin.

Club career
After he spent his youth career with Red Star Belgrade, Stanković moved to OFK Beograd on one-year loan in summer 2016. After the end of first half-season in which he made 4 appearances for OFK Beograd, a loan deal was terminated and he returned to his home club. After the end of contract with the club, Stanković left Red Star as a free agent in summer 2017.

Shortly after he left his former club, Stanković signed a five-year deal with Radnički Niš in last days of July 2017.

International career
Stanković was called into national team levels since 2013, when he was elected into the Serbia under-16 national team squad. Later he was a member of Serbia U17, and standard player of Serbia U18 & Serbia U19 teams.

Career statistics

Club

References

External links
 
 

1997 births
Living people
Footballers from Belgrade
Association football defenders
Serbian footballers
Serbia youth international footballers
Red Star Belgrade footballers
OFK Beograd players
FK Radnički Niš players
FK Car Konstantin players
Serbian First League players